The 2020 Poker Masters Online PLO Series was the fifth season of the Poker Masters. Following the COVID-19 pandemic, the Poker Masters moved online to partypoker with the 2020 Poker Masters Online in April before the addition of a PLO Series from June 21-20, 2020. The event was sponsored by Poker Central and partypoker, and some of the final tables were streamed on PokerGO, PokerGO's Facebook page, and partypoker's Twitch channel. There were 16 events on the schedule, and they were exclusively Pot-Limit Omaha. Buy-ins ranged from $5,000 to the $50,000 Main Event.

The Main Event was won by American Isaac Haxton, and the Poker Masters Purple Jacket was awarded to Finland's Eelis Pärssinen.

Schedule 
The schedule for the 2020 Poker Masters Online PLO Series was a Pot-Limit Omaha exclusive series of 16 events. All tournaments carried a prize pool guarantee of between $250,000 and $1,500,000. Each event last two days, and the final tables were streamed on PokerGO, PokerGO's Facebook page, and partypoker's Twitch channel.

Purple Jacket standings 
The 2020 Poker Masters Online PLO Series awarded the Purple Jacket to the player that accumulated the most points during the series. Finland's Eelis Pärssinen won one event and cashed six times on his way to accumulating $735,359 in winnings. Pärssinen accumulated 625 points and was awarded the Purple Jacket.

Results

Event #1: $10,000 Pot-Limit Omaha 

 2-Day Event: June 21-22, 2020
 Number of Entrants: 72
 Total Prize Pool: $720,000
 Number of Payouts: 9

Event #2: $5,000 Pot-Limit Omaha 

 2-Day Event: June 21-22, 2020
 Number of Entrants: 81
 Total Prize Pool: $405,000
 Number of Payouts: 12

Event #3: $10,000 Pot-Limit Omaha 

 2-Day Event: June 22-23, 2020
 Number of Entrants: 53
 Total Prize Pool: $530,000
 Number of Payouts: 6

Event #4: $5,000 Pot-Limit Omaha 

 2-Day Event: June 22-23, 2020
 Number of Entrants: 63
 Total Prize Pool: $315,000
 Number of Payouts: 9

Event #5: $25,000 Pot-Limit Omaha 

 2-Day Event: June 23-24, 2020
 Number of Entrants: 44
 Total Prize Pool: $1,100,000
 Number of Payouts: 6

Event #6: $10,000 Pot-Limit Omaha 

 2-Day Event: June 23-24, 2020
 Number of Entrants: 49
 Total Prize Pool: $500,000
 Number of Payouts: 6

Event #7: $10,000 Pot-Limit Omaha 

 2-Day Event: June 24-25, 2020
 Number of Entrants: 50
 Total Prize Pool: $500,000
 Number of Payouts: 6

Event #8: $5,000 Pot-Limit Omaha 

 2-Day Event: June 24-25, 2020
 Number of Entrants: 52
 Total Prize Pool: $260,000
 Number of Payouts: 6

Event #9: $25,000 Pot-Limit Omaha 

 2-Day Event: June 25-26, 2020
 Number of Entrants: 43
 Total Prize Pool: $1,075,000
 Number of Payouts: 6

Event #10: $10,000 Pot-Limit Omaha 

 2-Day Event: June 25-26, 2020
 Number of Entrants: 52
 Total Prize Pool: $520,000
 Number of Payouts: 6

Event #11: $10,000 Pot-Limit Omaha 

 2-Day Event: June 26-27, 2020
 Number of Entrants: 49
 Total Prize Pool: $500,000
 Number of Payouts: 6

Event #12: $5,000 Pot-Limit Omaha 

 2-Day Event: June 26-27, 2020
 Number of Entrants: 46
 Total Prize Pool: $250,000
 Number of Payouts: 6

Event #13: $10,000 Pot-Limit Omaha 

 2-Day Event: June 27-28, 2020
 Number of Entrants: 47
 Total Prize Pool: $500,000
 Number of Payouts: 6

Event #14: $5,000 Pot-Limit Omaha 

 2-Day Event: June 27-28, 2020
 Number of Entrants: 48
 Total Prize Pool: $250,000
 Number of Payouts: 6

Event #15: $50,000 Pot-Limit Omaha Main Event 

 2-Day Event: June 28-29, 2020
 Number of Entrants: 29
 Total Prize Pool: $1,500,000
 Number of Payouts: 4

Event #16: $5,000 Pot-Limit Omaha Mini Main Event 

 2-Day Event: June 28-29, 2020
 Number of Entrants: 118
 Total Prize Pool: $590,000
 Number of Payouts: 18

References

External links 

 Results

2020 in poker
Television shows about poker
Poker tournaments